USS Normannia (SP-756) was a United States Navy patrol vessel in commission from 1917 to 1918.

Normannia was built as a private motorboat of the same name in 1912 by Fellows Boat Works at San Diego, California. On 10 July 1917, the U.S. Navy acquired her under a free lease from her owner, F. Thum of Pasadena, California, for use as a section patrol boat during World War I. She was commissioned the same day as USS Normannia (SP-756).

Assigned to the 12th Naval District and based at San Francisco, California, Normannia operated on patrol duty for the rest of World War I, guarding the harbor entrance, protecting the coast between San Francisco and San Diego, and putting to sea for special duty on 13 August 1917.

The Navy returned Normannia to Thum on 23 December 1918.

Notes

References
 for USS Normannia (SP-756)
 for USS Nomad (SP-1046)
SP-756 Normannia at Department of the Navy Naval History and Heritage Command Online Library of Selected Images: U.S. Navy Ships -- Listed by Hull Number "SP" #s and "ID" #s -- World War I Era Patrol Vessels and other Acquired Ships and Craft numbered from SP-700 through SP-799
NavSource Online: Section Patrol Craft Photo Archive Normannia (SP 756)

1912 ships
Patrol vessels of the United States Navy
Ships built in San Diego
World War I patrol vessels of the United States